Team Novak is a Romanian cycling team established in 2018.

Team roster

Major results
2018
 National Time Trial Championships, Nicolae Tanovițchii
Overall Tour of Szeklerland, Nicolae Tanovițchii
Stage 1, Yegor Dementyev
Stage 2, Oleksandr Prevar
Stage 3, Andrii Bratashchuk
Stage 4a (ITT), Nicolae Tanovițchii
Stage 3 Tour de Hongrie, Andrii Bratashchuk

References

External links

UCI Continental Teams (Europe)
Cycling teams based in Romania